Thierry Veltman (born December 16, 1939 in Bussum) is a Dutch painter, sculptor, ceramist and art educator. He focuses in particular on figures and still life.

Life and career
Veltman won his first art prize at the age of 12, at an international exhibition of children's drawings in Brazil. In 1958, when he was 19, he exhibited his own interpretations of the Suriname rainforest. He went on to study at the Gerrit Rietveld Academie in Amsterdam. From the early 1960s Veltman exhibited extensively at art galleries in the Netherlands and sometimes beyond.

Veltman uses many drawing and painting techniques, often in mixtures. He is also active in sculpting, ceramics and art research. He is still influenced by spending some of his youth in South America.

Since 1966 he lived mostly in Dordrecht, with a short interlude in Amerongen. He taught many students painting and drawing, both in Dordrecht and at Ichthus College in Rotterdam. At Ichthus he founded the department of Art and Communication. Veltman is the author of the art education book "Individuality and drawing" (1978; in Dutch).

Thierry Veltman is married to Eelke.

Bibliography
 1975 - Thierry Veltman: schilderijen, tekeningen en etsen [Paintings, drawings and etchings]. Apeldoorn: Gemeentelijke Van Reekum Galerij (Catalogue)
 1978 - Individualiteit en het tekenen [Individuality and drawing]. Zutphen: Thieme

References

External links
 Personal website
 Blog about Thierry Veltman by Joris Veltman
Virtual exhibition: Thierry Veltman on Return
 Thierry Veltman at Galerie Vermeulen (paintings and bibliography in Dutch)
 Thierry Veltman page at the Netherlands Institute for Art History (includes references in Dutch art history books)

1939 births
Living people
Art educators
Contemporary painters
Dutch painters
Dutch male painters
Dutch potters
Dutch sculptors
Dutch male sculptors
Dutch ceramists
Gerrit Rietveld Academie alumni
People from Bussum
Artists from Dordrecht
20th-century sculptors
20th-century Dutch artists
21st-century ceramists
20th-century Dutch male artists